is a passenger railway station located in the town of Samukawa, Kōza District. Kanagawa Prefecture, Japan, operated by the East Japan Railway Company (JR East).

Lines

Station layout
The station consists of a single island platform with an elevated station building built over the tracks and platform. The station has a Midori no Madoguchi staffed ticket office.

Platforms

History
Samukawa Station was opened on September 28, 1921 as a station the Sagami Railway. A freight spur line, the Nishi-Samukawa Spur Line, began operations from May 10, 1922 (Its operations were discontinued in 1984). On June 1, 1944, the Sagami Railway was nationalized and merged with the Japan National Railways. Freight operations were discontinued in 1971. On April 1, 1987, with the dissolution and privatization of the Japan National Railways, the station came under the operation of JR East. Automated turnstiles using the Suica IC card system came into operation from November 2001. The station building was remodeled and expanded in 2006.

Passenger statistics
In fiscal 2019, the station was used by an average of 6,822 passengers daily (boarding passengers only).

The passenger figures (boarding passengers only) for previous years are as shown below.

Surrounding area
Samukawa Town Hall
Nissan Koki head office

Gallery

See also
List of railway stations in Japan

References

External links

Official home page.

Railway stations in Japan opened in 1921
Railway stations in Kanagawa Prefecture
Sagami Line
Samukawa